Wells is a cathedral city and civil parish in the Mendip district of Somerset, located on the southern edge of the Mendip Hills,  south-east of Weston-super-Mare,  south-west of Bath and  south of Bristol. Although the population recorded in the 2011 census was only 10,536, (increased to 12,000 by 2018) and with a built-up area of just , Wells has had city status since medieval times, because of the presence of Wells Cathedral. Often described as England's smallest city, it is actually second smallest to the City of London in area and population, but unlike London it is not part of a larger urban agglomeration.

Wells takes its name from three wells dedicated to Saint Andrew, one in the market place and two within the grounds of the Bishop's Palace and cathedral. A small Roman settlement surrounded them, which grew in importance and size under the Anglo-Saxons when King Ine of Wessex founded a minster church there in 704. The community became a trading centre based on cloth making and Wells is notable for its 17th-century involvement in both the English Civil War and the Monmouth Rebellion. In the 19th century, transport infrastructure improved with stations on three different railway lines. However, since 1964 the city has been without a railway link.

The cathedral and the associated religious and medieval architectural history provide
much of the employment. The city has a variety of sporting and cultural activities and houses several schools including The Blue School, a state coeducational comprehensive school that was founded in 1641, and the private Wells Cathedral School, which was founded possibly as early as 909 and is one of the five established musical schools for school-age children in the United Kingdom. Wells's historic architecture has led to the city being used as a shooting location for numerous films and television programmes.

History

The city was a Roman settlement that became an important centre under the Anglo-Saxons when King Ine of Wessex founded a minster church in 704. Two hundred years later, in 909, it became the seat of the newly formed bishopric of Wells; but in 1090, the bishop's seat was removed to Bath. The move caused severe arguments between the canons of Wells and the monks of Bath until 1245 when the bishopric was renamed the Diocese of Bath and Wells, to be elected by both religious houses. With the construction of the current cathedral and the bishop's palace in the first half of the 13th century, under the direction of Bishop Reginald and later Bishop Jocelin, a native of the city, Wells became the principal seat of the diocese.

The 8th-century port at Bleadney on the River Axe enabled goods to be brought to within  of Wells. In the Middle Ages overseas trade was carried out from the port of Rackley. In the 14th century a French ship sailed up the river, and by 1388 Thomas Tanner from Wells used Rackley to export cloth and corn to Portugal, and received iron and salt in exchange. Wells had been a centre for cloth making; however, in the 16th and 17th centuries this diminished, but the city retained its important market focus. Wells in the 19th century had the largest cheese market in the west of England.

Wells was listed in the Domesday Book of 1086 as Welle, from the Old English , not as a town but as four manors with a population of 132, which implies a population of 500–600. "Tidesput" or "Tithesput furlang" relates to the area east of the bishop's garden in 1245. Wells was part of, and gave its name to, the hundred of Wells Forum.

Wells had been granted charters to hold markets by Bishop Robert (1136–66) and free burgage tenure was granted by Bishop Reginald (1174–1191). Wells was recognised as a free borough by a Royal charter of King John in 1201. The city remained under episcopal control until its charter of incorporation from Queen Elizabeth I in 1589. City status was most recently confirmed by Queen Elizabeth II by letters patent issued under the Great Seal dated 1 April 1974, which granted city status specifically to the civil parish; on that date major local government reorganisation came into effect, which involved the abolition of the municipal borough of Wells.

Anne of Denmark, the wife of King James came to Wells on 20 August 1613. She was entertained by a pageant performed by the town's trades and crafts. The blacksmiths presented Vulcan's forge. The butchers made a tableau of "old virgins", with their attires made of cow tails and necklaces made of cow's horns, who were drawn in a chariot by men and boys dressed in ox skins. The mayor, William Bull, held a dinner for members of the queen's household including her four maids of honour. The Venetian ambassador Antonio Foscarini recorded her delight.

During the English Civil War (1642–1651), at what became known as the "Siege of Wells", the city found itself surrounded by Parliamentarian guns on the Bristol, Glastonbury and Shepton Mallet sides. Col. William Strode had 2,000 men and 150 horse. The Royalists evacuated the city. Parliamentarian troops then used the cathedral to stable their horses and damaged much of the ornate sculpture by using it for firing practice.

William Penn stayed in Wells shortly before leaving for America (1682), spending a night at The Crown Inn. Here he was briefly arrested for addressing a large crowd in the market place, but released on the intervention of the Bishop of Bath and Wells. During the Monmouth Rebellion (1685) the rebel army attacked the cathedral in an outburst against the established church and damaged the west front. Lead from the roof was used to make bullets, windows were broken, the organ smashed and horses stabled in the nave. Wells was the final location of the Bloody Assizes on 23 September 1685. In a makeshift court lasting only one day, over 500 men were tried and the majority sentenced to death.

Wells first station, Priory Road, opened in 1859 on the Somerset Central Railway (later the Somerset & Dorset Joint Railway, S&DJR) as the terminus of a short branch from Glastonbury. A second railway, the East Somerset, opened a branch line from Witham in 1862 and built Wells East Somerset station to the east of Priory Road. In 1870, the Cheddar Valley line branch of the Bristol & Exeter Railway from Yatton, reached Wells and built a third station at Tucker Street. Matters were simplified when the Great Western Railway acquired the Cheddar Valley and the East Somerset lines and built a link between them that ran through the S&DJR's Priory Road station. In 1878, when through trains began running between Yatton and Witham, the East Somerset station closed, but through trains did not stop at Priory Road until 1934. Priory Road closed to passenger traffic in 1951 when the S&DJR branch line from Glastonbury was shut, though it remained the city's main goods depot. Tucker Street closed in 1963 under the Beeching cuts, which closed the Yatton to Witham line to passengers. Goods traffic to Wells ceased in 1964. Southern Railway West Country class steam locomotive no 34092 was named City of Wells at a ceremony at Priory Road station in 1949. It was used to haul the Golden Arrow service between London and Dover. It was withdrawn from service in 1964, and rescued from a scrapyard in 1971, and as August 2021 was operational on the East Lancashire Railway.

During World War II, Stoberry Park in Wells was the location of a prisoner-of-war camp, housing Italian prisoners from the Western Desert Campaign, and later German prisoners after the Battle of Normandy. Penleigh Camp on the Wookey Hole Road was a German working camp.

Governance

Wells City Council is a parish council, with a membership of sixteen councillors, elected from three parish wards. They are (with the number of parish councillors each elects, in brackets): Central (four), St. Thomas' (six) and St. Cuthbert's (six).

The civil parish of Wells was formed in 1933 upon the merger of Wells St Cuthbert In and Wells St Andrew (the latter being the historic liberty of the cathedral, the bishop's palace, etc., amounting to just ). Wells is the successor parish for Wells Municipal Borough, which existed from the creation of municipal boroughs in 1835 to their abolition in 1974. The parish has held the city status of Wells since 1 April 1974 (previously held by the municipal borough) and the member of the City Council who chairs the council holds the historic office of Mayor of Wells, typically for one year. The current mayor (for the 2020–21 municipal year) is Councillor Philip Welch, who is the 647th Mayor of Wells. He was elected to office on 10 October 2020. Another historic position is that of the Town Crier.

The City Council has responsibility for local issues, including setting an annual precept (local rate) to cover the council's operating costs and producing annual accounts for public scrutiny. They also evaluate local planning applications and work with the local police, district council officers, and neighbourhood watch groups on matters of crime, security, and traffic. This includes city centre management including CCTV, an alcohol ban and regulating street trading permissions including the two funfairs held in the Market Place in May and November each year and the Wells in Bloom competition. The city council's role also includes initiating projects for the maintenance and repair of city facilities, as well as consulting with the district council on the maintenance, repair, and improvement of highways, drainage, footpaths, public transport, and street cleaning. They are involved in the management of the Community Sports Development Centre at the Blue School, the skateboard park and allotments in the grounds of the Bishop's Palace, Burcott Road and Barnes Close. Conservation matters (including trees and listed buildings) and environmental issues are also the responsibility of the council.

Wells Town Hall was built in 1778, with the porch and arcade being added in 1861 and the balcony and round windows in 1932. It is a Grade II listed building. It replaced the former on the site of the Market and Assize Hall in the Market Place, and a Canonical House also known as 'The Exchequer', on the authority of an Act of Parliament dated 1779. The building also houses the magistrates courts and other offices. The Assize court last sat here in October 1970.

Wells elects five councillors to Mendip District Council from the same three wards as are used for the City Council (two are returned from St Cuthbert's, two from St Thomas' and one from Central). The Mendip district was formed on 1 April 1974 under the Local Government Act 1972 and the district council is responsible for local planning and building control, local roads, council housing, environmental health, markets and fairs, refuse collection and recycling, cemeteries and crematoria, leisure services, parks, and tourism.

Wells is an electoral division (with the same boundaries as the civil parish) of Somerset and returns one councillor to Somerset County Council, which is responsible for running the largest and most expensive local services such as education, social services, libraries, main roads, public transport, policing and fire services, trading standards, waste disposal and strategic planning. Wells is part of the UK Parliament constituency of Wells. Since 2015 the Member of Parliament for Wells is James Heappey of the Conservatives.

The Wells city arms show an ash tree surrounded by three water wells, crested with a gold mural crown, with the Latin motto Hoc fonte derivata copia (translated: "the fullness that springs from this well").

The council formalised twinning links with Paray-le-Monial, France, and Bad Dürkheim, Germany in 1979, then added Fontanellato, Italy in 1983; the Wells Twinning Association and the Mayor of Wells organise the twinning activities.

, Mary Bignal-Rand, Danny Nightingale, The Rifles and the late Harry Patch have the Freedom of the City. The Somerset Light Infantry received the freedom of the City of Wells following their return from Cyprus in 1956.

City status

As the seat of an ancient cathedral and diocese, Wells is historically regarded as a city. City status was most recently confirmed by Queen Elizabeth II by letters patent dated 1 April 1974, which granted city status specifically to the civil parish. As the designation is typically awarded to a local council area, this administrative area is then considered to be the formal boundary of the city, including its urban and rural extents. Wells, due to its urban area and wider parish sizes, is near-smallest city on several measures based on 2011 statistics:

Its city council boundary area, surrounded wholly by countryside makes Wells the smallest free-standing city in the UK (2.11 sq mi) - the City of London is smaller (1.12) but is part of a much larger urban area (Greater London - 671 sq mi)
2nd smallest in England and UK by city council boundary area (2.11 sq mi) behind the City of London (1.12)
2nd smallest in England only by population and urban area (10,536 residents, 1.35 sq mi) behind the City of London (8,072, 1.12)
4th smallest in the UK by population and urban area behind St Davids (1,841 residents, 0.23 sq mi), St Asaph (3,355, 0.50) and the City of London (8,072, 1.12).

Geography
Wells lies at the foot of the southern escarpment of the Mendip Hills where they meet the Somerset Levels. The hills are largely made of carboniferous limestone, which is quarried at several nearby sites.

Along with the rest of South West England, the Mendip Hills have a temperate climate which is generally wetter and milder than the rest of England. The annual mean temperature is about 10 °C (50 °F) with seasonal and diurnal variations, but due to the modifying effect of the sea, the range is less than in most other parts of the United Kingdom. January is the coldest month with mean minimum temperatures between 1 °C (34 °F) and 2 °C (36 °F). July and August are the warmest months in the region with mean daily maxima around 21 °C (70 °F). In general, December is the dullest month and June the sunniest. The south west of England enjoys a favoured location, particularly in summer, when the Azores High extends its influence north-eastwards towards the UK.

Cloud often forms inland, especially near hills, and reduces exposure to sunshine. The average annual sunshine totals around 1600 hours. Rainfall tends to be associated with Atlantic depressions or with convection. In summer, convection caused by solar surface heating sometimes forms shower clouds and a large proportion of the annual precipitation falls from showers and thunderstorms at this time of year. Average rainfall is around 800–900 mm (31–35 in). About 8–15 days of snowfall is typical. November to March have the highest mean wind speeds, with June to August having the lightest. The predominant wind direction is from the south west.

The civil parish of Wells is entirely surrounded by the parish of St Cuthbert Out.

Demography
The population of the civil parish, recorded in the 2011 census, was 10,536. Of this number 97.5% are ethnically White (with the more specific White British category recorded at 93.5%) and 66.5% described themselves as Christian. The mean average age in 2011 was 41.9 years (the median age being 43). The population recorded for the Wells civil parish in the 2001 census was 10,406.

Economy
Following construction of the A39/A371 bypass, the centre of the city has returned to being that of a quiet market town. It has all the modern conveniences plus shops, hotels and restaurants. Wells is a popular tourist destination, due to its historical sites, its proximity to Bath, Stonehenge and Glastonbury and its closeness to the Somerset coast. Also nearby are Wookey Hole Caves, the Mendip Hills and the Somerset Levels. Somerset cheese, including Cheddar, is made locally. Wells is part of the Wells and Shepton Mallet travel to work area which also includes Glastonbury, Cheddar and surrounding areas.

The historic part of the city has often been used for filming both documentaries and many period films and television series, including some with very large productions. Recent examples (2014 to 2017) include filming for Series 2 of Poldark (2015 TV series), Dunkirk, Another Mother's Son, Broadchurch, The Levelling, Mum's List and The White Princess (miniseries). In addition to Wells Cathedral, the Bishop's Palace, Wells is particularly popular among productions, with filming at the latter conducted (in 2015–2016) for The Huntsman: Winter's War, Galavant, Terry and Mason's The Great British Food Trip, Escape to the Country and Holiday of My Lifetime, in addition to The White Princess (miniseries).

Transport

Wells is situated at the junction of three numbered routes. The A39 goes north-east to Bath and south-west to Glastonbury and Bridgwater. The A371 goes north-west to Cheddar and Weston-super-Mare, and east to Shepton Mallet. The B3139 goes west to Highbridge, and north-east to Radstock and Trowbridge. The nearest motorway connections are at junction 23 on the M5 via the A39 and at junction 19 of the M4 via the A39, A37 and M32.

Wells is served by First West of England bus services to Bristol and Bristol Temple Meads station, Bath, Frome, Shepton Mallet, Yeovil, Street and Weston-super-Mare, as well as providing some local service. It is served by Berrys Coaches daily Superfast service to and from London. The bus station is in Princes Road. The Mendip Way and Monarch's Way long-distance footpaths pass through the city, as does National Cycle Route 3.

Railways
Wells had two stations which were closed by the Beeching Axe in the 1960s: Wells (Tucker Street) railway station and Wells (Priory Road) railway station. The nearest railway line today is the East Somerset Railway.

The nearest station now for the national rail network is Castle Cary.

Education

The Blue School, founded in 1641, is a state coeducational comprehensive school and has been awarded Specialist science college status. It has 1,641 students aged 11–18 of both sexes and all ability levels.

Wells Cathedral School, founded in 909, is a private school that has a Christian emphasis and is one of the five established musical schools for school-age children in Britain. The school teaches over 700 pupils between the ages of 3 and 18. The school's boarding houses line the northern parts of the city and the music school retains close links with Wells Cathedral. The primary schools in Wells are Stoberry Park School, St Cuthbert's Church of England Infants School, St Cuthbert's Church of England Junior School and St Joseph and St Teresa Catholic Primary School.

Culture
Wells and Mendip Museum includes many historical artefacts from the city and surrounding Mendip Hills. Wells is part of the West Country Carnival circuit.

Wells Film Centre shows current releases and, in conjunction with the Wells Film Society shows less well known and historical films. The previous cinema, The Regal in Priory Road, closed in 1993 and is now Kudos Nightclub. It was built in 1935 by ES Roberts from Flemish bond brickwork with Art Deco features. It is a Grade II listed building, and was on the Buildings at Risk Register until its restoration which included the restoration and repair of the stained glass façade. Wells Little Theatre is operated by a voluntary society which started in 1902. In 1969 they took over the old boy's building of Wells Blue School, where they put on a variety of operatic and other productions.

Milton Lodge is a house overlooking the city. It has a terraced garden, which was laid out in the early 20th century, is listed as Grade II on the Register of Historic Parks and Gardens of special historic interest in England.

Religious sites

A walled precinct, the Liberty of St Andrew, encloses the twelfth century Cathedral, the Bishop's Palace, Vicar's Close and the residences of the clergy who serve the cathedral. Entrances include the Penniless Porch, The Bishop's Eye and Brown's Gatehouse which were all built around 1450.

The Church of St Cuthbert has a Somerset stone tower and a carved roof. Originally an Early English building (13th century), it was much altered in the Perpendicular period. The nave's coloured ceiling was repainted in 1963 at the instigation of the then Vicar's wife, Mrs Barnett. Until 1561 the church had a central tower which either collapsed or was removed, and has been replaced with the current tower over the west door. Bells were cast for the tower by Roger Purdy.

The polychromatic stone Church of St Thomas was built during 1856 and 1857 and extended by Samuel Sanders Teulon in 1864, commemorating the work of Richard Jenkyns the Dean of Wells who had cared for the poor in the east of the city.

Wells Vineyard Church is an Evangelical Church formed in 2003.

Wells Cathedral
The cathedral is the seat of the Church of England Diocese of Bath and Wells. Wells has been an ecclesiastical city of importance since at least the early 8th century. Parts of the building date back to the tenth century, and it is a grade I listed building. It is known for its fine fan vaulted ceilings, Lady Chapel and windows, and the scissor arches which support the central tower. The west front is said to be the finest collection of statuary in Europe, retaining almost 300 of its original medieval statues, carved from the cathedral's warm, yellow Doulting stone. The Chapter House, at the top of a flight of stone stairs, leading out from the north transept is an octagonal building with a fan-vaulted ceiling. It is here that the business of running the cathedral is still conducted by the members of the Chapter, the cathedral's ruling body. Wells Cathedral clock is famous for its 24-hour astronomical dial and set of jousting knights that perform every quarter-hour. The cathedral has the heaviest ring of ten bells in the world. The tenor bell weighs just over 56 CWT (6,272 lb, 2,844 kg).

The Vicars' Close is the oldest residential street in Europe. When viewed from the top, however, it looks shorter. The Old Deanery dates from the 12th century, and St John's Priory from the 14th. The street is owned by Wells Cathedral.

The Bishop's Palace
The Bishop's Palace has been the home of the bishops of the Diocese of Bath and Wells for 800 years. The hall and chapel date from the 14th century. Visitors can also see the Bishop's private chapel, ruined great hall and the gatehouse with portcullis and drawbridge beside which mute swans ring a bell for food. The Bishop's Barn was built in the 15th century.

Sport

The city has two football clubs, one being Wells City F.C., past winners of the Western League. Belrose FC play their football in the Mid-Somerset Football League at Haybridge Park. Wells Cricket Club runs eight sides across senior, junior and women's cricket; they are based at South Horrington. Wells Wanderers Cricket Club are based in Meare. Rowdens Road Cricket Ground was a first-class venue. No longer a cricket ground, it is now occupied in part by Wells FC.

Mid-Somerset Hockey Club and Wells City Acorns Hockey Club both play on the Astroturf pitches at the Blue School, where several other sports clubs are based. Wells Leisure Centre has a  swimming pool, gymnasium, sports hall, sauna, steam room, relaxation area and solarium. The 18-hole Wells Golf Club is on the outskirts of the city and also has a 24-bay driving range with optional grass tees.

In popular culture

Elizabeth Goudge used Wells as a basis for the fictional cathedral city of Torminster, in her book A City of Bells.

Wells has been used as the setting for several films including: The Canterbury Tales (1973), A Fistful of Fingers (1994), The Gathering  (2003), The Libertine (2004), The Golden Age (2007), and Hot Fuzz (2007, as Sandford). The cathedral interior stood in for Southwark Cathedral during filming for the Doctor Who episode "The Lazarus Experiment", and was also used as an interior location in the film Jack the Giant Slayer (2013), and in 2017 for the film Hellboy. In 2017 the market square and town hall was used for production of the BBC series Poldark.

Notable people

Hugh of Wells – native of Wells, Bishop, elder brother of Jocelin of Wells.
Jocelin of Wells – native of Wells, Bishop, aided in creation of Magna Carta and largely responsible for the construction of the cathedral.
Herbert E. Balch – cave explorer and founder of Wells Museum. His name was given to Balch Road, a council estate that was built in the 1950s.
Mary Bignall-Rand – Gold medalist and world record breaker in the long jump at the 1964 Summer Olympics.
Jack Buckner – won a gold medal in the 5000 metres at the 1986 European Athletics Championships in Stuttgart and a silver medal over the same distance in the 1986 Commonwealth Games in Edinburgh. Buckner also claimed a bronze medal at the 1987 World Athletics Championships in Athens.
Sir Chris Clarke – county councillor for Wells from 1985 to 2005.
Harry George Crandon – awarded the Victoria Cross during the Boer War.
Alexander Davie – born in Wells 1847, became 7th Premier of British Columbia.
Elizabeth Goudge – author of novels, short stories and children's books, was born in Wells in 1900.
Mary Hamilton – 18th century fraudster and cross-dresser
Roger Hollis – Director General of MI5.
John Holloway – Governor of Newfoundland (1807–1809) and Admiral of the Blue.
John Keate – born in Wells 1773, went on to become headmaster at Eton where he restored discipline with the birch, and once flogged 80 boys in one day.
James Keene – professional footballer formerly of Portsmouth F.C., playing for IF Elfsborg in Sweden.
Kris Marshall – actor, raised in the city and has lived there.
Harry Patch – last trench veteran of World War I, and at 111, briefly the oldest man in Europe and 3rd oldest man in the world. He was born in the nearby village of Combe Down and at the time of his death in July 2009 he was living in local care home Fletcher House.
Julia Somerville – born in Wells 1947, newsreader and journalist who is working with BBC and ITN and co-presenter of Rip Off Britain
Edgar Wright – film and television director. Directed Hot Fuzz, which was filmed in the city.
Waleran de Wellesley (died  c.1276), judge in Ireland and ancestor of the Duke of Wellington.

Arms

See also

Tourist attractions in Somerset

References

External links

Wells City Council
Wells Tourist Information

Wells
Cities in South West England
Market towns in Somerset
Towns in Mendip District
Civil parishes in Somerset
Mendip Hills
World War II prisoner of war camps in England